Holden Karau (born October 4, 1986) is an American-Canadian computer scientist and author based in San Francisco, CA. She is best known for her work on Apache Spark, her advocacy in the open-source software movement, and her creation and maintenance of a variety of related projects including spark-testing-base. She is also a member of The Apache Software Foundation.

Apache Spark

Holden is best known for her work on Apache Spark where she is a member of the PMC. In 2016, she was recognized for her work on Apache Spark by the Google Open Source Peer Bonus Program. She was also included in the Faces of Open Source work in recognition of her work in the open source community.

Author
Holden has written a number of books on technology including:
 Fast Data Processing With Spark 
 Learning Spark 
 High Performance Spark 
 Kubeflow for Machine Learning

References

External links

1986 births
Living people
Free software programmers
Place of birth missing (living people)
Open source advocates